Quadrisphaera is a Gram-positive genus of bacteria from the family of Kineosporiaceae.

References

Actinomycetia
Bacteria genera